General elections were held in Luxembourg on 21 October 1945. They were the first elections held after the German occupation during World War II. As a result of the war, the political alliances of the interwar period had been ended.  In their place were new parties; the Christian Social People's Party, the Luxembourg Socialist Workers' Party, and the Patriotic and Democratic Group in place of the Party of the Right, Socialist Party, and Radical Liberal Party respectively.  It is regarded as a realigning election, as the election established the party political order, with four established parties, that would be maintained until 1974.

The conservatives remained the dominant faction, and the Christian Social People's Party's leader, Pierre Dupong, was invited to head another government.  The election was also a success for both liberal and communist candidates, with both the Patriotic and Democratic Group and the Communist Party gaining four more seats than in the last election before the war. To restore political stability, Grand Duchess Charlotte asked Dupong to create a more broad-based coalition than the preceding Liberation Government.  The resulting National Union Government would embrace all four political parties, and also include the solitary independent, guaranteeing the support of the whole Chamber of Deputies.  The government remained in place until 1947.

Results

Notes

References

Chamber of Deputies (Luxembourg) elections
Legislative election, 1945
Luxembourg
1945 in Luxembourg
October 1945 events in Europe